ExploraVision is a scientific national contest held in the United States and Canada, a joint project by Toshiba Corporation and the National Science Teachers Association. Designed for K–12 students of all interest, skill and ability levels, ExploraVision encourages its participants to create and explore a vision of future technology by developing new ways to apply current science. Since 1992, more than 360,000 students from across the United States and Canada have competed.

Requirements 
Each student is limited to one entry per year. Each team must have no more than 4 students. Students and teachers/mentors complete a Toshiba/NSTA ExploraVision Awards Entry Form, signed by the students, coach and mentor, an abstract of their project, a detailed project description, a list of technology used that is available at present time, a bibliography, and five Web page graphics that will be used later to create an official web page for the project. If a team advances to the national level, they will then be challenged with 3 other tasks: 1. Make a prototype displaying how their project would work. 2. Create a video showing both what your project does and why it would be useful. 3. Make a website based on your webpage graphics that displays everything you submitted originally. There is a 1st and 2nd place for national winners. The 1st-place winners receive $10,000 worth of college funds each, and 2nd-place winners get $5,000. Both teams go on an all-expense-paid trip to Washington, D.C., where they get to be on live television, receive their awards and participate in many other activities.

References

External links 
 Official ExploraVision Site
 Past Winners from Education World

Recurring events established in 1992
1992 establishments in the United States
Science competitions
Toshiba
Science events